Bear Pond, published by Little, Brown and Company in 1990, is an "infamous book"  of nude photography by Bruce Weber and poetry by Reynolds Price.

References

1990 non-fiction books
1990 poetry books
Books of nude photography